Scott Andrew Crossley (born 1973) is an American linguist. He is a professor of applied linguistics at the Georgia State University, United States. His research focuses on natural language processing and the application of computational tools and machine learning algorithms in learning analytics including second language acquisition, second language writing, and readability. His main interest area is the development and use of natural language processing tools in assessing writing quality and text difficulty.

Along with Cumming, Hyland, Kormos, Matsuda, Manchón, Ortega, Polio, Storch and Verspoor he is considered one of the most prominent researchers on second language writing.

Career 
Crossley obtained his Bachelor of Arts degree in history at the California State University of Northridge in 1999. In the same year he obtained a Teaching English as a second or foreign language certificate at the University of Memphis. He got his Master of Arts degree in English language at the University of Memphis in 2002 and a Doctor of Philosophy degree in 2006.

Research
Crossley is noted for his work on second language acquisition with a special focus on second language writing and second language vocabulary. In his research he focused on coherence, cohesion, latent semantic analysis, hypernymy and readability. He is noted for the use of computational tools such as Coh-Metrix.

Crossley has been involved in the development of numerous natural language processing tools such as Constructed Response Analysis Tool (CRAT), Sentiment Analysis and Cognition Engine (SEANCE), Simple NLP (SiNLP), Tool for the Automatic Analysis of Lexical Sophistication (TAALES), Tool for the Automatic Analysis of Text Cohesion (TAACO), Tool for the Automatic Analysis of Syntactic Sophistication and Complexity (TAASSC).

Publications
Crossley's work has been published in the Written Communication, The Modern Language Journal, TESOL Quarterly, Journal of Second Language Writing, Language Learning, and Studies in Second Language Acquisition.

Bibliography

Articles

References

External links 
 

1960 births
Living people
Applied linguists
Second language writing
Linguists from the United States
California State University, Northridge alumni
University of Memphis alumni
Georgia State University faculty
Academic journal editors